View of Venice: The Piazzetta Seen from the Riva degli Schiavoni is an oil-on-canvas painting of Venice executed c. 1835–1845 by French artist Jean-Baptiste-Camille Corot. The painting is at the Norton Simon Museum in Pasadena, but as at 2019 not on display. 

The painting depicts the Piazzetta (an extension of the Piazza San Marco) from the Riva degli Schiavoni waterfront. In the centre is a column carrying the Lion of Venice, a sculpture of a winged lion.

References

External links
 Museum's website

Paintings by Jean-Baptiste-Camille Corot
1835 paintings
Cityscape paintings of Venice
Paintings in the collection of the Norton Simon Museum
Ships in art